Bankim Ghosh (22 October 1922 — 3 June 1992) was a veteran actor of Bengali film and theatre personality.

Early life
Ghosh was born in 1922 in Kolkata, British India. He passed Matriculate examination from Oriental Seminary and B.Com. from City College in 1938. He was a good athlete in student life. Ghosh won the Bengal Boxing Championship for five years continuously. He joined and performed in various theatre groups like Gananatya, Ananda Bharati, Rupkar. His father was dead against of his acting passion. Ghosh left home and worked several jobs in Jadavpur University, Indian Airlines and calcutta High Court etc.

Career
In 1948, Ghosh made his debut in the Bengali film with Bhuli Nai. Director Hemen Gupta offered him a small role in this film. Almost a decade later he played an important role in Sushil Ghosh’s movie Dilli Theke Kolkata in 1961. In his long acting career, Ghosh worked with famous directors like Tapan Sinha, Bijoy Bose, Rituparno Ghosh. Mainly he was known for serious antagonistic as well as comic roles. He also worked with Satyajit Ray in Charulata and Chiriyakhana. Ghosh was a social activist worked for child rights. He was involved with a child welfare group named Jatiyo Sangho.

Selected filmography
 Bhuli Nai
 Dilli Theke Kolkata
 Charulata
 Atithi (1965 film)
 Jiban Mrityu
 Chiriyakhana
 Kokhono Megh
 Chowringhee
 Kabita
 Arogya Niketan (film)
 Galpo Holeo Satti
 Bhanu Goenda Jahar Assistant
 Parineeta (1969 film)
 Alo Amar Alo
 Andha Atit
 Rater Rajanigandha
 Basanata Bilap
 Thagini
 Chhutir Phande
 Megh o Roudra
 Ranur Pratham Bhag
 Jadi Jantem
 Badnam
 Mayabini
 Hirer Angti

References

External links
 

1922 births
1992 deaths
People from Kolkata
20th-century Indian male actors
Male actors from Kolkata
Male actors from West Bengal
Indian male film actors
Bengali theatre personalities
Oriental Seminary alumni
City College, Kolkata alumni